Aida is a 2015 Moroccan drama film directed by Driss Mrini. The film was selected as the Moroccan entry for the Best Foreign Language Film at the 88th Academy Awards but it was not nominated.

See also
 List of submissions to the 88th Academy Awards for Best Foreign Language Film
 List of Moroccan submissions for the Academy Award for Best Foreign Language Film

References

External links
 

2015 films
2015 drama films
2010s Arabic-language films
Moroccan drama films